Hospodarske noviny is name of two newspapers, written without diacritics:

 Hospodářské noviny (English: Economic Newspaper) in the Czech Republic
 Hospodárske noviny (English: Economic Newspaper) in Slovakia